Parkway High School may refer to:

 Parkway High School (Louisiana), Bossier City, Louisiana
 Parkway High School (Ohio), Rockford, Ohio

See also

 Parkway Center City High School, Philadelphia, Pennsylvania
 Parkway Central High School, Chesterfield, Missouri
 Parkway North High School, Creve Coeur, Missouri
 Parkway South High School, Manchester, Missouri
 Parkway West High School (disambiguation)